George Edward Duke (6 September 1920 – 19 March 1988) was an English professional footballer who played as a goalkeeper in the Football League for Luton Town and Bournemouth & Boscombe Athletic.

Career statistics

References 

English footballers
English Football League players
1920 births
1988 deaths
Sportspeople from Chichester
Association football goalkeepers
Brentford F.C. wartime guest players
Southwick F.C. players
Luton Town F.C. players
AFC Bournemouth players
Chelsea F.C. wartime guest players
English football managers
Exeter City F.C. wartime guest players

Guildford City F.C. players